In paleolinguistics, a Semitism is a grammatical or syntactical behaviour in a language which reveals that the influence of a Semitic language is present. The most common example is the influence of Aramaic on some texts written in Jewish Koine Greek.

References 

Language contact
Semitic languages